The Anarchist-Communist Federation of Argentina (FACA in Spanish) is a federal anarchist political organization founded in 2010 that comprises 3 zones: Columna Libertaria Joaquin Penina from Rosario, Santa Fe, Columna Libertaria Errico Malatesta from Buenos Aires city, and the Columna Libertaria Buenaventura Durruti from West of Buenos Aires, in the Greater Buenos Aires.

Its main fronts of public social struggles are the unionized and the unemployed worker movements. Its current ideology is specifism, and is considered socialist and revolutionary. Although it shares the name with an anarchist organization from the 1930s, it's not considered as a continuation of it. Its public appearances emphasize the comeback of a committed social anarchism.

References

External links

Anarchist Federations
Anarchist organisations in Argentina
Far-left politics in Argentina
Platformist organizations